The bibliography of Herman Melville includes magazine articles, book reviews, other occasional writings, and 15 books. Of these, seven books were published between  1846 and 1853, seven more between 1853 and 1891, and one in 1924. Melville was 26 when his first, and had been dead for 33 years when his last, books were published. At the time of his death he was on the verge of completing the manuscript for his first novel in three decades, Billy Budd, and had accumulated several large folders of unpublished verse.

The year 1853 saw a physical disaster which renders the books published by him in America prior to that date even more scarce today than would normally have been the case. At one o'clock on the afternoon of Saturday, December 10, 1853, the establishment of Melville's publishers Harper Brothers was completely destroyed by fire, reportedly caused by a plumber throwing a lit candle into a bucket of camphene, which he mistook for water.  The fire burned Harper's stock of Melville's unsold books which consisted of: Typee, 185; Omoo, 276; Mardi, 491; Redburn, 296; White Jacket, 292 ; Moby-Dick, 297; and Pierre, 494.  Mardi and Pierre, Melville's two least popular books, had the largest number of unsold copies burned. Although Isle of the Cross is a possible lost work refused publication in 1853, the year was also the beginning of the long period of unpopularity precipitated by the appearance of Pierre and The Confidence Man (1857). Melville then turned his attention to poetry, to which he devoted more years than he had to travel adventure and fiction.

A Melville revival that began in the 1920s led to the reprinting of many of his works, then out of print in the United States. Raymond Weaver, Melville's first biographer,  edited a 16 volume edition for the London publisher Constable which included the first publication of Billy Budd. In 1926, Moby Dick was among the first titles in the newly founded Modern Library series. Beginning in 1948,  independent publisher Walter Hendricks recruited scholars to edit annotated editions of Melville's works, beginning with a volume of his poetry. Produced under the general editorship of Howard P. Vincent, the series was originally projected to include 14 volumes but in the end no more than 7 appeared.

In the 1960s, Northwestern University Press, in alliance with the Newberry Library and the Center for Scholarly Editions of the Modern Language Association, established ongoing publication runs of Melville's various titles. The aim of the editors, Harrison Hayford, Hershel Parker, and G. Thomas Tanselle, was to present unmodernized "critical texts"  which represented "as nearly as possible the author's intentions." The editors adopted as "copy text" either the author's fair copy manuscript or the first printing based on it, which were then collated against any further printings in Melville's lifetime, since he might have made corrections or changes. In the case of Moby-Dick, for instance, after collating the American and British editions from the various printings, the editors adopted 185 revisions and corrections from the English edition and incorporated 237 emendations made by the editors. The "Editorial Appendixes" for each volume included an "Historical Note" on composition and publication, an extensive account of the editorial process, a list of emendations and changes, as well as related documents.

Melville's lifetime earnings from his first seven books (over a period of 41 years, from 1846 to 1887) amounted to $10,444.53, of which $5,966.40 came from American publishers and $4,478.13 from British. The best-selling title in the United States was Typee (with 9,598 copies). The book which earned Melville the most in the United States was Omoo ($1,719.78).

Novels

Short stories
The publication dates of Melville's stories in no way correspond to their dates of composition; with editorial considerations, such as length vs. amount of space available, usually determining when they would appear. The Piazza Tales was the only collection of Melville's stories published under his direct supervision. The volume sold slowly in spite of generally favorable notices. Its publishers, Dix & Edwards, dissolved their partnership in 1857 and, it appears, paid the author no royalties on either this book or their other published title of his, The Confidence Man. The plates were put up for sale at publishers' auction but attracted no bidders. As one editor commented, "no one would risk a dollar on Melville."

The plates were subsequently sold for scrap. In 1922, during the Melville revival, there was a complete resetting of the book for its publication in the Constable edition of Melville's Complete Works. That same year saw the Princeton University Press issue a collection of the remaining known stories under the title The Apple-Tree Table and Other Sketches. The final two stories in the list were discovered in the box turned over to biographer Raymond Weaver by Melville's granddaughter (the same box which yielded Billy Budd) and appeared in the final Constable volume titled Billy Budd and Other Prose Pieces.

Poetry
Melville's reputation as a poet rose dramatically in the late 20th century. After the disastrous publication of The Confidence-Man in 1857, Melville turned to the writing of poetry. Virtually ignored by the public and scorned by reviewers, he nevertheless persevered in this endeavor for the next 30 years. Early biographers conveyed the perception of Melville as a novelist who dabbled unsuccessfully in verse. Despite early claims for him as one of the three best American poets before 1900, histories of American poetry for many years all but ignored him. The neglect was partly because until the Northwestern-Newberry edition, the poetry was available only in incomplete "complete" editions, selections, reprints, and editions of individual titles—most of these out of print, few of them textually reliable, and all of them together falling well short of completeness. "That Melville was a poet only in prose is a truth almost universally acknowledged among his critics, one guaranteed to endure as long as the poems remain unavailable in a complete, reliable edition."

In July 2009 Northwestern-Newberry released Published Poems: The Writings of Herman Melville Vol. 11 the most complete collection to date, containing substantial scholarly notes on individual poems. The final volume (12), Billy Budd and Other Later Manuscripts contains the unpublished poems. The fact remains that Melville wrote fiction for 11 years, poetry for over 30. Although it is true he wrote more prose than poetry, the same can be said of Walt Whitman and T. S. Eliot both of whom wrote less verse than Melville did. With Clarel he wrote one of the longest poems in the English language. If one includes the poems contained in his novels his entire poetic oeuvre approaches the size of Lord Byron's or Robert Browning's.

Collections

Single poems
 "The Admiral of the White," published in 1885 in both the New York Daily Tribune and the Boston Herald.

Uncollected or unpublished in Melville's lifetime

 Weeds and Wildings, with a Rose or Two (1924) A book of poems written for his wife and dedicated to her. Unpublished at the time of his death although a fair copy had been made by Elizabeth Melville for the printer. First published in Volume 16 of the Constable edition of Melville's Works (London 1924), then reprinted in a somewhat different order and form in Collected Poems of Herman Melville, Chicago 1947.
 "Epistle to Daniel Shepherd" – first published in Herman Melville: Representative Selections, Willard Thorp, Ed. (New York, 1938).

The following were first published in Collected Poems of Herman Melville, Howard P. Vincent Ed. (Chicago 1947):
 "Inscription for the Slain at Fredericksburgh" [sic]
 "The Haglets" (an expansion of "The Admiral of the White")
 "To Tom"
 "Suggested by the Ruins of a Mountain-temple in Arcadia"
 "Puzzlement"
 "The Continents"
 "The Dust-Layers"
 "A Rail Road Cutting near Alexandria in 1855"
 "A Reasonable Constitution"
 "Rammon"
 "A Ditty of Aristippus"
 "In a Nutshell"
 "Adieu"

Essays
The following essays were uncollected during Melville's lifetime:

 "Fragments from a Writing Desk, No. 1" (Democratic Press, and Lansingburgh Advertiser, May 4, 1839)
 "Fragments from a Writing Desk, No. 2" (Democratic Press, and Lansingburgh Advertiser, May 18, 1839)
 "Etchings of a Whaling Cruise" (New York Literary World, March 6, 1847)
 "Authentic Anecdotes of 'Old Zack'" (Yankee Doodle, II, excerpted September 4, published in full weekly from July 24 to September 11, 1847)
 "Mr Parkman's Tour" (New York Literary World, March 31, 1849)
 "Cooper's New Novel" (New York Literary World, April 28, 1849)
 "A Thought on Book-Binding" (New York Literary World, March 16, 1850)
 "Hawthorne and His Mosses" (New York Literary World, August 17 and August 24, 1850)

Other
Correspondence, Ed. Lynn Horth. Evanston, IL and Chicago: Northwestern University Press and The Newberry Library (1993). 
Journals, Ed. Howard C. Horsford with Lynn Horth. Evanston, IL and Chicago: Northwestern Univ. Pr. and The Newberry Library (1989).

References

External links

 
 
 The Life and Works of Herman Melville (last revised July 2000)
 
 The Northwestern-Newberry Edition of the Writings of Herman Melville – All of Melville's writings published with extensive notes and commentary
 A Checklist Of Herman Melville's First and Major Editions
 Collecting Herman Melville by William S. Reese, 1993
 Melville's marginalia A virtual archive of books Melville owned or borrowed and a digital edition of books he marked and annotated. 

Herman Melville
Bibliographies by writer
Bibliographies of American writers
Poetry bibliographies